Superman is a 1997 Indian Malayalam-language action film written and directed by Rafi Mecartin, starring Jayaram and Shobana. The film was produced and distributed by Siddique, Lal and Azeez under the banner of Kavyachandrika.

Plot

Nithya, a deputy police commissioner, is assigned a corruption case involving the Home Minister and his friend, a businessman called Rajan Phillip. Unknown to her, a criminal nicknamed Superman helped her in the investigation.

Superman, whose real name is Hareendran nurtures a vendetta against the Home minister Rajan Phillip and uses Nithya to trap his enemies. In the process, Superman uses the judiciary as his weapon and frames the men responsible for his tragic past. He provides vital information to the police for the same. In order to collect evidence, Superman himself breaks the law, but as it is for the greater good, Nithya looks the other way.

Cast
Jayaram as Hareendran / Superman
Shobana... DCP Nithya IPS
Jagadish... SI Balachandran (Hareendran's friend)
Siddique... City Police Commissioner Rajagopal IPS
Innocent... Kochunni (friend of Hareendran)
Janardhanan... Nithya's Valyachan
Sreejaya Nair... Nalini Balachandran
Paravoor Ramachandran... MSV
Cochin Haneefa... Rajan Philip
Spadikam George... CI Jagannathan
Nedumudi Venu... Raman Nair (Hareendran's father)
Zeenath... Bhavani (Hareendran's mother)
Vinduja Menon... Hareendran's sister
Bindu Panicker... Swarnalatha (Jaganathan's wife)
James... Chakkachampparambil Joy
T. P. Madhavan... Home Minister of Kerala
Krishna Kumar... Himself (As Newsreader)

Reception
The film was a huge success in box office . The majority of the film was shot in Thiruvananthapuram. The climax sequences involved a number of CCTV cameras (which were not popular at the time) and visuals were filmed at Technopark Campus Trivandrum.

Soundtrack 

S. P. Venkatesh scored the music for this film which was written by S. Ramesan Nair and I. S. Kundoor. The music was distributed by Kavyachandrika Audios.

References

External links
 

1990s Malayalam-language films
1997 romantic comedy films
1997 films
1990s romance films
Indian action films
Legal thriller films
Films about lawyers
Films shot in Thiruvananthapuram
Films directed by Rafi–Mecartin